Carl Dohmann (born 18 May 1990) is a male German racewalker. He competed in the 50 kilometres walk event at the 2015 World Championships in Athletics in Beijing, China, but did not finish. At the 2016 Summer Olympics, he competed in the 50 km walk, but did not finish the race.

In 2018, he competed in the men's 50 kilometres walk at the 2018 European Athletics Championships held in Berlin, Germany. He finished in 5th place.

See also
 Germany at the 2015 World Championships in Athletics

References

External links 
 
 
 

1990 births
Living people
German male racewalkers
Place of birth missing (living people)
World Athletics Championships athletes for Germany
Athletes (track and field) at the 2016 Summer Olympics
Olympic athletes of Germany
Athletes (track and field) at the 2020 Summer Olympics